James D. Iverson (August 22, 1930 – October 26, 2020) was an American basketball player and coach.

Career
After a college career at Kansas State (KSU), he was drafted by the Boston Celtics in the second round of the 1952 NBA draft. Iverson later coached South Dakota State University from 1956 to 1965, winning the 1963 NCAA College Division Tournament.

Iverson was a high school star at Platte High School in Platte, South Dakota, where he was named all-state three times. He played college basketball at Kansas State, where he started three seasons for coach Jack Gardner. In his three seasons there, the Wildcats won two Big Seven Conference titles and in 1951 played for the NCAA title, losing to the Kentucky Wildcats. Iverson also played baseball at KSU.

Following the close of his Kansas State career, Iverson was drafted in the second round of the 1952 NBA draft by the Boston Celtics. He served two years in the U. S. Army, then joined the Celtics for the 1954–55 preseason. However, he was one of the final cuts for the team.

After his playing career, Iverson coached several service teams in the United States and Japan before earning the head coaching position at South Dakota State (SDSU) in 1956. Iverson had success at SDSU, winning a North Central Conference title in 1959, then leading the Jackrabbits to the National Collegiate Athletic Association (NCAA) College Division title in 1963, defeating Wittenburg 44–42 on a last-second shot. Iverson was ultimately fired in 1965 for providing excessive aid to student athletes, when it came to light that he had given player Maurice White $275.

Iverson died on October 26, 2020 at the age of 90.

Head coaching record

References

External links
College stats @ sports-reference.com
South Dakota Sports Hall of Fame profile

1930 births
2020 deaths
American men's basketball coaches
American men's basketball players
Basketball coaches from South Dakota
Basketball players from South Dakota
Boston Celtics draft picks
College men's basketball head coaches in the United States
Guards (basketball)
Kansas State Wildcats baseball players
Kansas State Wildcats men's basketball players
People from Platte, South Dakota
South Dakota State Jackrabbits men's basketball coaches